This is a list of awards and nominations received by Momoland, a South Korean girl group formed in 2016 by MLD Entertainment. Momoland has received a total of 23 awards out of 64 nominations.

Awards and nominations

References

Awards
Momoland